The inauguration of John Quincy Adams as the sixth president of the United States took place on Friday, March 4, 1825, in the House Chamber of the U.S. Capitol in Washington, D.C. The inauguration marked the commencement of the only four-year term of John Quincy Adams as president and the first term of John C. Calhoun as vice president. Adams was the first president to have been the son of a former president–John Adams; and Calhoun, at age 42 on Inauguration Day, was the second-youngest vice president (after Daniel D. Tompkins, who was 3 months younger when inaugurated into office in 1817).

Chief Justice of the United States John Marshall administered the Oath of office to the new president. Adams, as he recalled later, placed his hand upon on a book of law rather than the Bible itself as he recited the oath. This may have been common practice at the time; there is no concrete evidence that any president from John Adams to John Tyler used a Bible to swear the oath upon. His inaugural address was 2,915 words long.

Adams wore a short haircut instead of long hair tied in a queue and long trousers instead of knee breeches, and was the first to make the change of dress.

Background

John Quincy Adams was elected president by the House of Representatives after none of the four candidates secured a majority of votes in the electoral college in the 1824 presidential election, as prescribed by the Twelfth Amendment to the Constitution. The outcome was assured when Henry Clay, one of the front-runners, threw his support to Adams so that Andrew Jackson's candidacy would fail. Jackson had polled more popular votes in the election, but he did not gain enough electoral votes to win outright. Adams ran for re-election in 1828, but lost to Jackson.

See also
Presidency of John Quincy Adams
1824 United States presidential election

References

External links

More documents from the Library of Congress
Text of J.Q. Adams' Inaugural Address

United States presidential inaugurations
1825 in American politics
1825 in Washington, D.C.
Presidency of John Quincy Adams
March 1825 events